

History 
Separated in 2008 from the Gorgan University of Agricultural Sciences and Natural Resources, founded in 1957, The Golestan University is a major institute of higher education located in Gorgan, a large city bordering the Caspian Sea, in the province of Golestan, in north-eastern Iran. Acceptance to Golestan University as a publicly funded university, is through a highly competitive entrance exam Nationwide University Entrance Exams. Golestan University has close ties with Golestan Science and Technology Park, Golestan University of Medical Sciences and Gorgan University of Agricultural Sciences and Natural Resources. GU offers a wide range of courses in three faculties: Humanities, Sciences, and Engineering and Technology (in two campuses).

With 155 academic staff, four faculties and various research centers, there are nearly 4000 students in 72 fields of study, including undergraduate, postgraduate and research scholars leading to B.Sc., B.Eng., M.Sc., B.A., M.A., and Ph.D. degrees. The university is spread over three campuses.

Amir Hossein Amirpour (Voice Actor and Artist) born 2000, announced that he will probably enter in Golestan University of Gorgan for studying in master degree of Computer Engineering, software orientation.

Faculties 

At present, Golestan University is spread over three campuses housing four faculties and research centers:

 Faculty of Sciences
 Faculty of Engineering and Technology (Gorgan and Ali Abad)
 Faculty of Humanities

References

External links
Official website 
Planta Persica Journal

Universities in Iran
Education in Golestan Province
Buildings and structures in Golestan Province